Giuseppe Salvago Raggi (17 May 1866 – 28 February 1946) was an Italian diplomat, born in Genoa. He was ambassador of Italy to China (1899–1901) and France. He was the Italian colonial governor of Somaliland (1906–1907) and Eritrea (1907–1915). He is best known for signing the Boxer Protocol on behalf of the Kingdom of Italy.

See also
 List of Directors and Commissioners-General of the United Nations Relief and Works Agency for Palestine Refugees in the Near East
 Ministry of Foreign Affairs (Italy)
 Foreign relations of Italy

References

1866 births
1946 deaths
Ambassadors of Italy to France
Ambassadors of Italy to China
Italian diplomats